is a Japanese manga series written and illustrated by Yuhki Kamatani. It was serialized in Kodansha's seinen manga magazine Monthly Morning Two from October 2020 to May 2022, with its chapters collected in three tankōbon volumes. The story follows a god, an immortal, and a suicidal girl who travel together.

Plot
Mika, a junior high student, is grieving the loss of her best friend and determined to reunite with her in death. However, her path collides with an unnamed god journeying to Yomi (the land of the dead) and their companion Hibino, an immortal man who is following the god in hopes of learning how to finally end his own life. Together, the three travel by motorbike to Shimane Prefecture, where the entrance to Yomi is said to be located.

Publication
Written and illustrated by Yuhki Kamatani, Hiraeth: The End of the Journey was serialized in Kodansha's seinen manga magazine  from October 22, 2020, to May 20, 2022. Kodansha collected its chapters in three tankōbon volumes, released from April 23, 2021, to August 23, 2022.

In North America, the series is licensed by Kodansha USA. The first volume was released on March 29, 2022. As of July 12, 2022, two volumes have been released.

Volume list

Reception
Hiraeth: The End of the Journey was one of the Jury Recommended Works at the 25th Japan Media Arts Festival in 2021.

References

External links
  
 
 

Drama anime and manga
Fiction about suicide
Japanese mythology in anime and manga
Kodansha manga
School life in anime and manga
Seinen manga
Shimane Prefecture in fiction